Olin's Bridge, or Olin Bridge, or Olin-Dewey Road Bridge is a covered bridge that carries Dewey Road over the Ashtabula River in Plymouth Township, Ashtabula County, Ohio, United States.  The bridge, one of currently 16 drivable bridges in the county, is a single span Town truss design, and is currently the only bridge in the county named for a family.  The Olin family has owned property next to the bridge since it was built.  Members of the Olin family also operate a small museum and gift shop just east of the bridge at the house previously owned by Joyce Grandbouche.  The bridge’s WGCB number is 35-04-03, and it is located approximately 3.6 mi (5.7 km) east of Ashtabula.

History
1873 – Bridge constructed.
1985 – Bridge renovated.
The Olin family owned land next to the bridge. Alson and Alvina (Bennett) Olin were a pioneering family, coming to this area in 1832 from New York. His son Alson Olin, bought land in 1860, next to where the bridge now sits.

Dimensions
Length: 115 feet (35.1 m)
Overhead clearance: 12 feet (3.7 m)

Gallery

See also
List of Ashtabula County covered bridges

References

External links
Ohio Covered Bridges List
Ohio Covered Bridge Homepage
The Covered Bridge Numbering System
Ohio Historic Bridge Association
Olin's Covered Bridge from Ohio Covered Bridges, Historic Bridges
Olin Family Society (OFS)

Covered bridges in Ashtabula County, Ohio
Bridges completed in 1873
Road bridges in Ohio
Wooden bridges in Ohio
Lattice truss bridges in the United States